The 1985–86 Western Kentucky Hilltoppers men's basketball team represented Western Kentucky University during the 1985–86 NCAA Division I men's basketball season. The Hilltoppers were led by Sun Belt Conference Coach of the Year Clem Haskins, in his final year at the helm.  WKU finished second in the conference and received a bid to the 1986 NCAA Division I men's basketball tournament.
This team's roster featured three future NBA players Tellis Frank, Kannard Johnson, and Clarence Martin.  Billy Gordon, Johnson, and Martin were selected to the All-Conference Team, while Ray Swogger made the SBC All-Tournament Team.

Schedule

|-
!colspan=6| Regular Season

|-

|-
!colspan=6| 1986 Sun Belt Conference men's basketball tournament

|-
!colspan=6| 1986 NCAA Division I men's basketball tournament

Awards and honors
Clem Haskins – Sun Belt co-Coach of the Year

References

Western Kentucky
Western Kentucky Hilltoppers basketball seasons
Western Kentucky
Western Kentucky Basketball, Men's
Western Kentucky Basketball, Men's